Xylota silvicola is a species of hoverfly in the family Syrphidae distributed in Russia.

References

Eristalinae
Insects described in 1987
Diptera of Asia